With Mum is a 2013 Bosnian drama film directed by Faruk Lončarevič. It was selected as the Bosnian entry for the Best Foreign Language Film at the 87th Academy Awards, but was not nominated.

Cast
 Marija Pikić as Berina
 Mira Furlan as Jasna
 Branko Đurić as Mladen
 Sanja Vejnović as Kaca
 Igor Skvarica as Tarik
 Edina Kordić as Luna
 Mirela Lambić as a Colleague from work
 Nina Đogo as a Nurse
 Faketa Salihebgović as a Worker at a counter

See also
 List of submissions to the 87th Academy Awards for Best Foreign Language Film
 List of Bosnian submissions for the Academy Award for Best Foreign Language Film

References

External links
 

2013 films
2013 drama films
Bosnian-language films
Bosnia and Herzegovina drama films